The Englerulaceae are a family of fungi with an uncertain taxonomic placement in the class Dothideomycetes.

The genre names of Englerula and Englerulella are in honour of Heinrich Gustav Adolf Engler (1844 – 1930), who was a German botanist. He is notable for his work on plant taxonomy and phytogeography.

References

Dothideomycetes enigmatic taxa
Dothideomycetes families